Lucky 7 was an American pop punk band from San Diego, California. They formed in 1997 and the next year independently released their first record, titled Miss Fortune.  After touring with bands such as 
New Found Glory, Something Corporate, Pink, and Good Charlotte and receiving internet notice created by their high download rate at MP3.com, Lucky 7 signed with Shock Records/Omega Records, where they released their self-titled label-debut in 2002. The group disbanded in 2003.

Shortly after, Allen Colaneri joined Lances Hero, and ItalianJapanese which later broke up.  He currently owns/operates the Blonde Bar in San Diego. Robert Garbowski plays drums in a band called Sweettooth. Jared Hren currently plays in the LA based drum group  Street Drum Corps, a "Stomp-like" percussion group. Hren also plays drums in the US lineup of Guana Batz. Steven Press moved to Colorado and is employed as a law enforcement officer in the Denver area.

Members
Allen Colaneri - vocals/guitar
Darin Brookner - guitar
Steven Press - bass, backing vocals
Robert Garbowski  - drums
Aaron Crossland (1998–1999)  - bass, backing vocals
Jared Hren (2002–2003) - drums

Discography

Music Videos
 "California Girl"
 "Be The One"

Awards

References
VH1 Artist Page
Amazon.com
[ Allmusic.com]

Musical groups from San Diego
Pop punk groups from California